James Sanderson Ditty (1880–1962) was a photo-engraver in the Seattle area for 30 years and an "adventurous entrepreneur" and "hard-nosed" businessman who was involved in the developing of Bellevue, Washington. He is best known today as a businessman whose ideas contributed to the development of a city across the lake from Seattle.

He was involved in the Beaux Arts Village, building a house there. As an engraver he was a member of the Seattle Cartoonists' Club and  did the engraving for two of their vanity cartoon books of wealthy Seattleites and Washington state-congressmen.

Highlights
1911 James S. Ditty builds English Tudor home in Beaux Arts Community. Ultimately the venture to create an artists colony would fail, the land held for the community's center being sold off, but it would result in a community being founded and Ditty was there to participate.

"Early on", Ditty constructed a cluster of stores, a quarter mile north of Main Street in Bellevue.

1924: One of Bellevue's first developers, Ditty predicted a day when 200,000 people would live on the Eastside.

1928 Ditty publishes map showing his vision for Bellevue and Mercer Island, Washington. He devised detailed plans including the bridging of Lake Washington and an area filled with golf courses and airports.

1929 James S. Ditty envisions east-side metropolis.

Background and Family
James was born in Hudson, Ohio and raised in Cleveland with his brothers Thomas Ross and Frank Leonard Ditty. James Ditty moved to Seattle in 1904. He was a photoengraver there. He became friends with James Calvert, and as part of the artists' colony, helped to found the Beaux Arts Village.

His brothers Thomas Ross Ditty and Frank Leonard Ditty were also photoengravers in Seattle in 1910. James engraved two books for Frank Calvert (illustrator), architectural books of elaborate homes in San Francisco and Seattle. Thomas and Frank didn't stay, returning to Cleveland where they grew up. Their mother moved with them for a period, but died in Bellevue, Washington (near her son James), April 4, 1925.

James married Catherine Theresa De Harpport and they had three children, James, Margaret, and Dorothy. In 1933 he married Helen Whaley.

References

External links
Map done by James Ditty in 1928 to show the future he envisioned for Bellevue and Mercer Island, Washington.

1880 births
1962 deaths
American printmakers
Businesspeople from Seattle
People from Bellevue, Washington
Businesspeople from Cleveland
People from King County, Washington
20th-century American businesspeople